A. Ahmed may refer to:

A. Ahmed 
 Ahmed Ghailani (born 1974), conspirator of the al-Qaeda terrorist organization
 Abdel Rahman Sobhy, Egyptian gymnast
 Abdul Rahman Ahmed, Bahraini footballer

Ahmed A. 
 Ahmed Ahmed (born 1970), Egyptian-born American actor
 Ahmed Adel Ibrahim, Egyptian gymnast
 Ahmed Aldayani, Qatari gymnast
 Ahmed Asmat Abdel-Meguid (1923–2013), Egyptian diplomat
 Ahmed Al-Kudmani (born 1979), Saudi Arabian swimmer
 Ahmed Adnan Saygun (1907–1991), Turkish composer
 Ahmed Abou Hashima, CEO of Egyptian steel
 Ahmed Abukhater, architect
 Ahmed Al-Arbeed Kuwaiti fencer
 Ahmed Abdi Godane (1977–2014), Emir (leader) of Al-Shabaab
 Ahmed Al-Fahad Al-Ahmed Al-Sabah (born 1963), Kuwaiti politician
 Ahmed Awad Ibn Auf,  Sudanese general and politician